Reginald R. Gross (born January 1962) is an American convicted murderer and former professional boxer who competed from 1982 to 1988. His most notable wins were a first round knockout of future long-time IBF world Light-Heavyweight champion "Prince" Charles Williams, as well as upsets of undefeated Smokin' Bert Cooper (TKO8) and outstanding amateur and 16-0 pro Jimmy Clark (TKO9).

He was most famously stopped in one round by Mike Tyson, in an exciting but brief bout where he took the fight to the feared contender. He also suffered losses to Frank Bruno and Jesse Ferguson.

His final fight was in June 1988, on the Tyson/Spinks undercard, where he lost to Donovan Ruddock in the second round.

Conviction and imprisonment 
In 1989, he was arrested and convicted for three contract killings. He is currently serving his three life sentences with two of them consecutive with the initial part of his sentence served at the maximum security prison in Edgefield, South Carolina.

When interviewed in 2008 Gross was incarcerated at the US Penitentiary, Hazelton and had a 2014 parole hearing planned.

In September 2019, Gross petitioned the US Court of Appeals as he believed that he was eligible for mandatory release after thirty years, as his crimes occurred before the Sentencing Reform Act of 1984 came into effect. The Court found in favor of the Bureau of Prisons, who argued that because he is serving two consecutive life sentences, he would in fact need to serve thirty years on each of his two life sentences before being eligible for mandatory parole.

 Gross was incarcerated at Terre Haute FCI in Indiana with a release date of November 1, 2048.

Professional boxing record

|-
|align="center" colspan=8|19 Wins (14 knockouts, 5 decisions), 8 Losses (5 knockouts, 3 decisions)
|-
| align="center" style="border-style: none none solid solid; background: #e3e3e3"|Result
| align="center" style="border-style: none none solid solid; background: #e3e3e3"|Record
| align="center" style="border-style: none none solid solid; background: #e3e3e3"|Opponent
| align="center" style="border-style: none none solid solid; background: #e3e3e3"|Type
| align="center" style="border-style: none none solid solid; background: #e3e3e3"|Round
| align="center" style="border-style: none none solid solid; background: #e3e3e3"|Date
| align="center" style="border-style: none none solid solid; background: #e3e3e3"|Location
| align="center" style="border-style: none none solid solid; background: #e3e3e3"|Notes
|-align=center
|Loss
|
|align=left| Donovan Ruddock
|TKO
|2
|27/06/1988
|align=left| Boardwalk Hall, Atlantic City, New Jersey
|align=left|
|-
|Win
|
|align=left| Harry Terrell
|KO
|2
|06/01/1988
|align=left| Baltimore Arena, Baltimore, Maryland
|align=left|
|-
|Loss
|
|align=left| Adilson Rodrigues
|PTS
|10
|11/10/1987
|align=left| Araraquara, Brazil
|align=left|
|-
|Loss
|
|align=left| Frank Bruno
|TKO
|8
|30/08/1987
|align=left| Nueva Andalucia Bullring, Marbella, Spain
|align=left|
|-
|Loss
|
|align=left| Mike Tyson
|TKO
|1
|13/06/1986
|align=left| Madison Square Garden, New York City, New York
|align=left|
|-
|Loss
|
|align=left| Henry Tillman
|UD
|10
|04/03/1986
|align=left| Resorts Casino Hotel, Atlantic City, New Jersey
|align=left|
|-
|Win
|
|align=left| Bert Cooper
|TKO
|8
|31/01/1986
|align=left| Trump Plaza Hotel and Casino, Atlantic City, New Jersey
|align=left|
|-
|Win
|
|align=left| Hector Rodriguez
|TKO
|3
|28/06/1985
|align=left| Scranton, Pennsylvania
|align=left|
|-
|Win
|
|align=left| Jimmy Clark
|TKO
|9
|08/03/1985
|align=left| Catholic Youth Center, Scranton, Pennsylvania
|align=left|
|-
|Loss
|
|align=left| Jesse Ferguson
|TKO
|3
|20/09/1984
|align=left| The Sands, Atlantic City, New Jersey
|align=left|
|-
|Win
|
|align=left| James Reid
|PTS
|10
|06/09/1984
|align=left| Baltimore Civic Center, Baltimore, Maryland
|align=left|
|-
|Loss
|
|align=left| Jack Johnson
|PTS
|10
|23/05/1984
|align=left| Pikesville, Maryland
|align=left|
|-
|Loss
|
|align=left| Anthony Witherspoon
|TKO
|7
|11/04/1984
|align=left| Pikesville Armory, Pikesville, Maryland
|align=left|
|-
|Win
|
|align=left| Marcus Jackson
|TKO
|3
|27/02/1984
|align=left| The Sands, Atlantic City, New Jersey
|align=left|
|-
|Win
|
|align=left| Franklin Otts
|KO
|1
|18/08/1983
|align=left| Baltimore Civic Center, Baltimore, Maryland
|align=left|
|-
|Win
|
|align=left| Abdul Hakim
|KO
|5
|27/06/1983
|align=left| Ocean City Convention Center, Ocean City, Maryland
|align=left|
|-
|Win
|
|align=left| Larry Lane
|PTS
|8
|05/05/1983
|align=left| Baltimore Civic Center, Baltimore, Maryland
|align=left|
|-
|Win
|
|align=left| Blufort Spencer
|TKO
|7
|08/04/1983
|align=left| Steelworkers Hall, Baltimore, Maryland
|align=left|
|-
|Win
|
|align=left| Charles Williams
|TKO
|1
|01/03/1983
|align=left| Baltimore Civic Center, Baltimore, Maryland
|align=left|
|-
|Win
|
|align=left| Fred Brown
|KO
|2
|16/12/1982
|align=left| Steelworkers Hall, Baltimore, Maryland
|align=left|
|-
|Win
|
|align=left| Ric Lainhart
|TKO
|6
|23/09/1982
|align=left| Steelworkers Hall, Baltimore, Maryland
|align=left|
|-
|Win
|
|align=left| Charles Price
|PTS
|6
|09/07/1982
|align=left| Baltimore Civic Center, Baltimore, Maryland
|align=left|
|-
|Win
|
|align=left| Sonny Crooms
|KO
|2
|24/06/1982
|align=left| Resorts Casino Hotel, Atlantic City, New Jersey
|align=left|
|-
|Win
|
|align=left| Michael Statton
|PTS
|4
|17/05/1982
|align=left| Hilton Hotel, Baltimore, Maryland
|align=left|
|-
|Win
|
|align=left| John Green
|KO
|1
|24/04/1982
|align=left| Richmond, Virginia
|align=left|
|-
|Win
|
|align=left| Charles Roye
|PTS
|4
|23/01/1982
|align=left| Richmond, Virginia
|align=left|
|-
|Win
|
|align=left| Blufort Spencer
|KO
|1
|07/01/1982
|align=left| Steelworkers Hall, Baltimore, Maryland
|align=left|
|}

Sources

External links
 

1962 births
Living people
Boxers from Baltimore
American sportspeople convicted of crimes
American people convicted of murder
Prisoners sentenced to life imprisonment by South Carolina
American prisoners sentenced to life imprisonment
People convicted of murder by South Carolina
American male boxers
Heavyweight boxers